The Marlborough School is a coeducational Church of England secondary school in the market town of Woodstock, about  northwest of Oxford. The school's catchment area includes Woodstock and surrounding villages.

The school is named after the Duke of Marlborough whose ancestral home, Blenheim Palace, is in Woodstock. It has been included in The Sunday Times Parent Power Top Schools lists. The school received the British Council's International School Award for 2009–2012 and 2012–2015.

In the 2008–2009 academic year the school enrolled more than a thousand pupils. It is the second most over-subscribed school in Oxfordshire, after Cherwell.

History
The Marlborough C of E School was built in 1939 as a secondary modern.  It was opened by the Bishop of Dorchester, suffragan bishop of the Anglican Diocese of Oxford. The original school was one single storey building which became known as the main block.  There is a foundation stone bearing the details of the opening of the school at the main entrance. The interior of the main block has been remodelled extensively over the years. Pam Maynard was heavily involved in the progression and development of the school.

After World War II pre-fabricated ex-army barracks were erected at the west end of the site. At various times these were used for home economics teaching and as a sixth form common room. This block was finally replaced in 2009. The music and science buildings, sports hall, library and cafeteria were added in the 1970s as part of the ROSLA (Raising of the School Leaving Age) building programme.

1970s to 1990s

From the 1970s through to 1985, the school had a reputation as a progressive comprehensive, with a focus on teaching how to learn and how to socialise, which it did with varying degrees of success. Former headmaster, Gerry O'Hagan, favoured CSEs (Certificate of Secondary Education, achievement graded by 1–5, 5 the lowest and 1 an equivalent to a C grade or above at O Level) over GCE (General Certificate of Education) O Level examinations as he prioritised cumulative and cooperative learning over competition. O'Hagan could be said to have been ahead of his time: The two examinations have since been replaced by the modern GCSE (General Certificate of Secondary Education).  
 
The school suffered particularly badly from the underfunding of English state education in the 1980s and early 1990s under the Conservative government of Margaret Thatcher. Some of the Foreign Language Department and some parts of the English and Science Departments were based in temporary Portakabin classrooms on the east of the site. The largest of these, "the battleship" erected in the late 1980s was only replaced by a permanent building almost a decade later. Starting in the late 1980s, new language, mathematics and sixth form blocks were built to complement the existing science, music, library/cafeteria buildings and sports hall.

O'Hagan was replaced by Ed McConnell who resigned in 2005 to reorganise Kent Education.

21st century
In 2007, plans were unveiled for a £1-million school building with a new theatre, cinema and conference venue. This building, the Marlborough Enterprise Centre, opened in early 2007 and saw a student-led production of Joseph and the Amazing Technicolour Dreamcoat in July of the same year.

In 2010, a £3.8-million science center, dedicated to the memory of Oxfordshire County Councillor Brian Hodgson, was opened by Prof. Peter Dobson, director of Oxford University's Begbroke Science Park, and was blessed by the Bishop of Dorchester, the Rt. Rev. Colin Fletcher.

Every other year the School produces a Summer Show. These have included Oliver!, Grease, The Wizard of Oz and Bugsy Malone.

The annual Presentation Assemblies invite notable local people to hand students their awards.

The Marlborough School Chamber Choir has toured in Europe a number of times; visiting places such as Venice, Prague, the Santa Maria de Montserrat and Barcelona. In July 2009 they travelled to Strasbourg and performed three concerts in and around the city. The Choir has also performed Christmas Carols at Blenheim Palace in 2007 and 2008, and released several recordings. Choristers from The Marlborough School Chamber Choir were recently interviewed by Phil Mercer of BBC Oxford to discuss their tour plans and their music programme.

Marlborough students enjoy outdoor sports in Blenheim Park as well as a yearly "Fun Run" which pays for The Woodstock Pensioners Annual Christmas Dinner.

On 1 October 2012 the school converted to academy status. The school is now sponsored by the River Learning Trust.

Head Students and Prefects
The school has a prefect system. Currently, a Head and Deputy Head Boy and Girl are elected annually from Year 13. They participate in a variety of school events, acting as ambassadors for the school.

Elective System
All students in years 8 to 11 enrol in the Electives system; an introductory programme exists for the Year 7 students. The school dedicates two lessons on Wednesday afternoons for pupils for extra-curricular activities. At the end of a school year, students receive an Electives Brochure, and an Electives form, which allows students to choose an extra curricular activity for the following year. The students can choose from up to six options, putting listing them in order of preference. Three preferences will be allocated: Normally, the first preference is offered the first term, the second in the second term, and the third preference in the last term.

While most electives are free, some electives have transportation fees and course costs. Students can choose a variety of electives, from ones that help to improve fitness, to tutoring and personal leisure. The system is broad and ranges from the Duke of Edinburgh Award to needlework and equestrian sports.

Ormerod Department
Since 2005, The Marlborough School has included an embedded unit from the Ormerod School in Headington. This enables children with disabilities in Oxfordshire to be educated in a mainstream secondary school. On 1 September 2007 the two schools merged on the Woodstock site and the Headington site was closed.

Ormerod School was named after the physician Sir Arthur Latham Ormerod (born 1870), a son of the physician Edward Latham Ormerod. From 1901 until 1929 Sir Arthur was Oxford's first Medical Officer for Health. In 1928 he instigated the founding of the Ormerod School in Headington.

The Sixth Form
The Sixth Form at Marlborough is an essential and integral body of the school. The students are mostly non-leavers from previous years however newcomers are welcomed.  The Sixth Formers are allowed privileges which Year 7–11 students are denied, such as, a free dress code, meaning no school uniform is required. Students are allocated free periods in which they are expected to study, they have assigned rooms for only sixth form students in regards to this. The Sixth Form Common room is a hall assigned to Years 12 and 13 in which the majority of the Sixth Form relax. The Sixth Form also enjoy their 'Sixth Form Garden', which is attached to their Common Room.

There are approximately 160 members of the Marlborough Sixth Form.

Notable alumni

Josh McEachran, footballer (attacking midfielder for Chelsea F.C.)
Rupert Friend, actor, The Libertine, Pride & Prejudice The Boy in the Striped Pajamas, Young Victoria, Chéri, Homeland (TV series)
Richard Walters, musical artist & songwriter
Ed Atkins, visual artist

References

External links 
 The school's website

Secondary schools in Oxfordshire
Educational institutions established in 1939
Church of England secondary schools in the Diocese of Oxford
1939 establishments in England
Academies in Oxfordshire